Sylvester Lvovich Stankievich (31 December 1866 – 11 March 1919) was an Imperial Russian corps commander. He fought in the war against the Empire of Japan. After the October Revolution, he fought against the Bolsheviks in the subsequent civil war.

Awards
Order of Saint George, 4th degree, 1900
Order of Saint Anna, 3rd class, 1902
Order of Saint Stanislaus (House of Romanov), 2nd class, 1903
Order of Saint Anna, 2nd class, 1904
Order of Saint Vladimir, 4th class, 1904
Gold Sword for Bravery (February 9, 1907)
Order of Saint Vladimir, 3rd class, 1913
Order of Saint Stanislaus (House of Romanov), 1st class (April 5, 1915)
Order of Saint George, 3rd degree (November 3, 1915)
Order of Saint Anna, 1st class (May 14, 1916)
Order of Saint Vladimir, 2nd class (August 23, 1916)

1866 births
1919 deaths
Russian military personnel of the Russo-Japanese War
Russian military personnel of World War I
People of the Russian Civil War
Polish generals in the Imperial Russian Army
Polish people of World War I
Recipients of the Order of St. Anna, 3rd class
Recipients of the Order of Saint Stanislaus (Russian), 2nd class
Recipients of the Order of St. Anna, 2nd class
Recipients of the Order of St. Vladimir, 4th class
Recipients of the Gold Sword for Bravery
Recipients of the Order of St. Vladimir, 3rd class
Recipients of the Order of Saint Stanislaus (Russian), 1st class
Recipients of the Order of St. George of the Third Degree
Recipients of the Order of St. Anna, 1st class
Recipients of the Order of St. Vladimir, 2nd class
Deaths from typhus